The Autostrada A6 is an Italian motorway opened in 1960 which connects Turin, the southernmost area of Piedmont, especially the Cuneo province, to the west coast of Liguria and the city of Savona. Its construction finished in 2001, when it was completely overhauled into a two-road motorway

History

Construction 
The motorway was built in stages starting in 1956. It began with the Savona – Ceva stretch being inaugurated on 27 January 1960. Work began shortly after in 1961 on the Ceva – Fossano stretch, including a connection to the city of Fossano and to the SS 28 for Turin. In May 1970, the Moncalieri – La Rotta section opened, followed by the Marene – Fossano stretch in July of the same year. Finally, in 1972, the initial Turin – Moncalieri – La Rotta section was built, with a separate roadway to Carmagnola.

The Fiat track 
In 1972, a second roadway was put into operation in direction to Savona. This roadway was located in the stretch between Carmagnola and the Rio Coloré West service area. This roadway was used exclusively by FIAT as a test track for higher speeds. The track began three kilometers (approximately 1.86 miles) from the Carmagnola junction, with the terminal square being just before the service area. There is also a square that was used as a technical track at overpass number 33, just 25.400 km in. Claudio Maglioli was known to have used the track to try and bring a Lancia LC2 to the record speed of 387 km/hr in preparation for the Le Mans race.

Dangers and safety concerns 
The single roadway of the highway was considered very dangerous from marker 13 to 110 km, as the middle lane was used regularly for passing by both directions. Head-on collisions were common, with 91 incidents and three deaths in 1971 alone. For this, the highway was dubbed the "highway of death". At one point in 1980, the number of fatal accidents was so high, judicial authorities ordered the closure of the highway in the Ceva – Altare section towards Savona. This was ordered on 17 July 1980; not long after, on 1 October that year, the highway was reopened. The central passing lane was removed, and the speed limit was lowered to 70 km/h.

Doubling 
In 1973, the doubling of Savona – Altare began, with the inauguration being in 1976. Later on in 1989, plans to double the stretch from Priero to Altare began. Work began in December 1993 and ended in July 1995. Four exits ceased use: Moncalieri "La Rotta" at the 3 km marker, the Vicoforte sanctuary at 67 km, Montezemolo at 92 km, and Carcare.

Sections of the plain were affected by works starting from Carmagnola using the sediment from the FIAT track. This began in 1991 and ended in 2001, which was also the end of the entire doubling plan.

The highway today 

Since 2001, the A6, known as "La Verdemare", has safety regulations similar to main Italian roadways. The system develops through landscapes and open territories, such as the border between Piedmont and Liguria, most notably the Savona – Altare Apennine stretch. The A6 also passes the Colle di Cadibona at 435m, a watershed between the Ligurian Apennines and the Po Valley in 14 km with an uninterrupted route of tunnels and viaducts and, exclusive to Italy, a helical curve in the south roadway.

The A6 is also connected to the new Autostrada A33 Asti – Cuneo. The Asti East tollgate of the A21 Torino – Piacenza – Brescia will take you through Alba to the tollgate of the A6.

The concessionary company is Autostrada dei Fiori, which is controlled by SIAS (Gavio group).

The entire route coincides with the European road E717 and, at the junction for Fossano, branches off to a link that leads to the SS28.

Electronic speed control 
In two sections of each roadway, the average speed is monitored by the Tutor system, implemented between the Carmagnola and Marene stations (both roadways), near Priero (north roadway only), and Quiliano (south roadway only). The effectiveness of the system in the Carmagnola – Marene section is considered limited due to the presence of the Rio Coloré Service Area in the section.

Route table

Fossano Junction 
The Fossano Junction, which is only a single roadway, have signs indicating the beginning and end of the highway. Signs indicate the overpass as being a part of the A6 highway. According to the internal numbering of Autostrade per l'Italia, the link is classified as a D06 branch.

Legislative Decree 461 of 29 October 1999 included the link as national interest and classified it as part of the A6.

The junction extends for 6.1 km from the start of the junction.

References

A06
Transport in Piedmont
Transport in Liguria